The Polish Sociological Review is a quarterly peer-reviewed academic journal published by the Polish Sociological Association. It covers diverse areas of sociology, especially social theory, social structure, social change, culture and politics in global perspective. The journal publishes articles in English.

Until 1993 it was published under the name Polish Sociological Bulletin.

Abstracting and indexing 
The Polish Sociological Review is abstracted and indexed in:
 JCR
 Social Sciences Citation Index
 CSA Sociological Abstracts
 CSA Linguistics and Language Behaviour Abstracts
 CSA Social Planning/Policy and Development Abstracts
 Scopus
 SocINDEX
According to the Journal Citation Reports, the journal has a 2011 impact factor of 0.071, ranking it 132nd out of 137 journals in the category "Sociology".

Editorial board 
Editor in Chief
Krzysztof Zagórski
(Kozminski University)
psr@pts.org.pl
Statistical Editor
Katarzyna Piotrowska
(Kozminski University)
Managing Editor
Hanna Mokrzycka
psr@pts.org.pl
Editorial Board
Zygmunt Bauman (University of Leeds), Zbigniew Bokszański (University of Łódź), Henryk Domański (Polish Academy of Sciences), Irina Tomescu-Dubrow (Polish Academy of Sciences, Ohio State University), Sven Eliaeson (University
of Uppsala), Brian Green (Keen College), Michal Illner (Czech Academy of Sciences), Jarosław Kilias (University of Warsaw), Martin Krygier (University of New South Wales), Jan Kubik (Rutgers University), Joanna Kurczewska (Polish
Academy of Sciences), György Lengyel (Budapest University of Economic Sciences), Rachel Lovell (Case Western Reserve University), Arvydas Matulionis (Lithuanian Social Research Centre), Barbara Misztal (University of Leicester),
Janusz Mucha (AGH University), Michał Nowosielski (Institute for Western Affairs), David Ost (Hobart William Smith Colleges), Jan Pakulski (University of Tasmania), Grażyna Skąpska (Jagiellonian University), Kazimierz M. Słomczyński
(Polish Academy of Sciences; Ohio State University), Jerzy Szacki (University of Warsaw) Jan Zielonka (Oxford University)

References

External links 
 

Publications established in 1961
Quarterly journals
Sociology journals
Multilingual journals
Academic journals published by learned and professional societies
Polish literature
Academic journals published in Poland